María Antonia Iglesias González (15 January 1945 – 29 July 2014) was a Spanish writer and journalist.

Iglesias was born in Madrid.  Her father was the pianist and musicologist Antonio Iglesias Álvarez, and she worked on publications such as Informaciones, Triunfo, Tiempo, Interviú, or El País'.

Iglesias said in many media that although she was Catholic she did not agree with many attitudes of the current Roman Catholic Church.  She died in Panxón, Nigrán, Province of Pontevedra, aged 69.

RadioHoy por hoy, (Cadena SER)La Brújula (2002, Onda Cero)Protagonistas (2004–2006, Punto Radio)

 Television Informe Semanal, 1984, RTVEDía a día (1996–2004, Telecinco)Cada día (2004-2005-2006, Telecinco)Lo que inTeresa (2006, Antena 3)Las Mañanas de Cuatro (2006–2009, Cuatro)Madrid opina (2006–2008, Telemadrid)La mirada crítica (2008, Telecinco)
 La noria (2008–2011, Telecinco)

 Bibliography 
 Memoria de Euskadi. La terapia de la verdad: todos lo cuentan todo (2009)
 Cuerpo a cuerpo. Cómo son y cómo piensan los políticos españoles (2007)
 Maestros de la República. Los otros santos, los otros mártires (2006)
 La memoria recuperada. Lo que nunca han contado Felipe González y los dirigentes socialistas (2003)
 Aquella España dulce y amarga / Carmen Sevilla y Paco Rabal (1999)
 Ermua, cuatro días de julio'' (1997), about Miguel Ángel Blanco.

References

External links
 
 www.revistafusion.com
 www.elpais.com (07/03/08)

1945 births
2014 deaths
Spanish women journalists
Spanish Roman Catholics
20th-century Spanish dramatists and playwrights
20th-century Spanish women writers